Tuija Helander (born 23 May 1961) is a Finnish former hurdler. She finished seventh in the 400m hurdles final at the 1984 Los Angeles Olympics, and fifth in the 400m hurdles final at the 1987 World Championships, in a career-best time of 54.62 secs.

Between 1977 and 1990, Helander won the Finnish 400m hurdles title 10 times and also won the 400m title in 1985 and 1987. From 1987, she competed under her then married name of Tuija Helander-Kuusisto.

International competitions

References

1961 births
Living people
Athletes (track and field) at the 1984 Summer Olympics
Finnish female hurdlers
Olympic athletes of Finland
World Athletics Championships athletes for Finland
Place of birth missing (living people)
20th-century Finnish women
21st-century Finnish women